Esther Anderson may refer to:

Esther Anderson (Jamaican actress) (born 1946), Jamaican filmmaker, photographer and actress
Esther Anderson (Australian actress) (born 1979), Australian actress and model
Esther Anderson (Sanford and Son), fictional character in Sanford and Son